4th Civil Affairs Group (4th CAG) is a civil affairs unit of the United States Marine Corps. It is based in Hialeah, Florida. For information on 4th CAG prior to 2012, see 2nd Civil Affairs Group, which was formed out of the original 4th CAG in Washington D.C. It is one of only four civil affairs groups in the Marine Corps, all of which are reserve units. 4th CAG was the first civil affairs group in the Marine Corps and mostly supports II MEF.

Organization
4th CAG is commanded by a Colonel and the unit has 38 Marine officers, 85 Marine enlisted, 4 Navy officers and 1 Navy enlisted. The unit consists of one Headquarters Detachment and three Line Detachments. Civil Affairs Marines carry the secondary Military Occupational Specialty (MOS) 0530/0531 (Civil Affairs Officer/Specialist) in addition to their primary military operational speciality.

History
On November 1, 1955, 4th CAG was activated originally as 5th Staff Group at Henderson Hall, Arlington, Virginia. The first commanding officer was Colonel Winslow H. Randolph Jr. In 1973, the unit had a table of organization of 30 officers and 50 enlisted and was commanded by Colonel J. Z. Taylor. In the late 1970s, 4th CAG supported several iterations of Operation Solid Shield with NATO. In 1979, 4th CAG was relocated to Naval Support Facility Anacostia. 4th CAG activated several Marines for the first time in the unit's history to support Operation Just Cause in Panama. The entire unit was activated for the first time in December 1990 and deployed for Operation Desert Storm in 1991. During Operation Desert Storm, 4th CAG was assigned to 2nd Marine Division and helped process over 10,000 Iraqi POWs. Immediately upon return from the Middle East, a detachment from 4th CAG deployed to Northern Iraq in support of Operation Provide Comfort to provide humanitarian aid to Kurdish refugees.  4th CAG sent numerous detachments to the Balkans in mid-1990s until 2003. 4th CAG participated in numerous New Horizons missions in Central/South America and the Caribbean Islands. 4th CAG deployed to Iraq three times for the Iraq War: (1) February to September 2003, (2) August 2004 to March 2005 and (3) September 2006 to April 2007. 4th CAG sent a detachment to support Joint Task Force Katrina in New Orleans, Louisiana, from September to October 2005. 4th Civil Affairs Group also sent detachments to Afghanistan for Operation Enduring Freedom in May 2009, November 2009, and August 2011 and participated in Operation Strike of the Sword.

On December 15, 2013, 4th CAG was reactivated and relocated to Hialeah, Florida, as part of the Force Structure Review. Colonel Augustin Bolanio was assigned as the Group Commander and Sergeant Major Mark T. Davis was posted as the Group Sergeant Major. 4th CAG's primary mission is to provide civil affairs support to the U.S. Southern Command.

Unit awards

  Presidential Unit Citation
March 21, 2003, to April 24, 2003 (with I MEF)
May 29, 2009, to April 12, 2010 (with 2d MEB)
  Navy Unit Commendation
January 1997 to November 2001
August 2, 2004, to February 1, 2005 (with I MEF)
September 2006 to March 2007 (with I & II MEF)
  Meritorious Unit Commendation
August 1, 1990, to June 30, 1991 (with 4th MarDiv)
  Commandant of the Marine Corps Certificate of Commendation
December 1978 to December 1980

Notable members
Richard Blumenthal, U.S. Senator from Connecticut
Paul W. Brier, USMC Major General CO, 6th Civil Affairs Group; CG, 4th Marine Division
Rich Brenner, sportscaster
Bill Cahir, ran for United States Congress, subsequently killed in action while serving with the CAG in Afghanistan
Micah Caskey, South Carolina House of Representatives
C. Boyden Gray, diplomat
Paul Hackett, ran for United States Congress
Andrew Horne, ran for United States Congress
Charles Lollar, ran for Governor of Maryland
Raj Mukherji, New Jersey Assemblyman
Mackubin Thomas Owens, writer
Helen Pratt, Major General
Arnold L. Punaro, retired Major General
Van Taylor, politician
Frank Ryan, member of Pennsylvania House of Representatives
Robert J. Zangas, first Coalition Provisional Authority civilian killed in action

Notes

References
 4th CAG briefed this slideshow presentation at the Civil Affairs Association Winter Board Meeting on February 4, 2006, and it contained a good summary of the organization and its missions. It also contained a synopsis of 4th CAG support to OIF and the future direction of the unit.

External links

4th Civil Affairs Group homepage
Civil Affairs Association homepage

Civil affairs groups of the United States Marine Corps
Force Headquarters Group